Our Great National Parks is a five-part Netflix documentary series about some of the world's national parks and their wildlife. It is presented by former president of the United States Barack Obama and was released on April 13, 2022.

Cast
 Barack Obama, narrator

Critical assessment

The documentary received generally positive reviews upon its release. A reviewer writing for the Hollywood Reporter described Obama's skills as a narrator: "He explains the synergistic ways in which governmentally reserved natural spaces can have non-antagonistic relationships with nearby human populations. He contributes wry humor to the scripts, with their slightly superficial, overly anthropomorphic explanations for animal behavior. And, more than that, his trademark deliberate cadences and oft-emulated calculated pauses are a perfect delivery mechanism for letting lovely nature photography breathe", adding that it "doesn’t push too hard to be educational [but]....Just because Our Great National Parks isn’t always revelatory definitely doesn’t mean, though, that it isn’t generally attractive and occasionally breathtaking."

A reviewer writing for the Houston Press said that the series is "the single most calming thing on television" and went on to say that "What truly sets Our Great National Parks apart, though, is the message woven into the episodes. Pragmatically, Obama tells us how various parts of humanity have made preserving the wild world a priority."

The review in the San Diego Union Tribune observed that the series is "devoted to the eye-popping, heart-stopping, consciousness-raising wonders of the world’s most astounding national parks."

A less favorable review in The Daily Telegraph described the series as"dazzlingly gorgeous yet a long way short of groundbreaking" and compared Obama's role negatively to David Attenborough, concluding "where David Attenborough enthusiastically brings to life the tooth and claw rhapsody of the natural world, Obama sounds stilted, even bored."

Episodes

Release

Accolades

References

External links
 
 

2022 American television series debuts
2022 American television series endings
2020s American documentary television series
2020s American television miniseries
English-language Netflix original programming
Netflix original documentary television series
Television series by Higher Ground Productions
Primetime Emmy Award-winning television series
National parks
Barack Obama